Larry David Grathwohl (October 13, 1947 – July 18, 2013) was a United States Army veteran and an FBI informant in the 1970s. He infiltrated the Weather Underground and co-wrote a book about his experiences: Bringing Down America: An FBI informer with the Weathermen (1976).

References

External links
 Larry Grathwohl on Bill Ayers' plan for American re-education camps

1947 births
2013 deaths
Federal Bureau of Investigation informants
Members of the Weather Underground
United States Army personnel